Coleophora namella is a moth of the family Coleophoridae that is endemic to Namibia.

References

External links

namella
Moths described in 2004
Endemic fauna of Namibia
Moths of Africa